Fata Morgana often refers to:

 Fata Morgana (mirage), an optical phenomenon

Fata Morgana may also refer to:

Film and television
 "Fata Morgana", a cinematic technique used by the Continental Wondergraph Company screening films in Australia around 1910
 Fata Morgana (1965 film), a Spanish drama
 Fata Morgana (1971 film), by Werner Herzog
 Fata Morgana (2007 film), a German film
 Fata Morgana (game show), a 2004–2008 Flemish TV show 
 "Fata Morgana" (Sanctuary), a 2008 TV episode

Literature
 Fata Morgana, an 1896 novel by Elisabeth Bürstenbinder
 Fata Morgana, a 1902–1910 novella by Mykhailo Kotsiubynsky
 Fata Morgana, a 1904 novel by André Castaigne
 "Fata Morgana", a 1941 long poem by André Breton
 Fata Morgana, a 1977 crime novel by William Kotzwinkle
 Fata Morgana, a 1992 crime novel by Roy Jacobsen
 Fata Morgana, a 1999 science fiction novel by Leo Frankowski
 Fata Morgana, a 2007 poetry collection by Reginald Shepherd

Music

Albums
 Fata Morgana, a 1995 album by Omer Faruk Tekbilek
 Fata Morgana, a 1995 EP by Fata Morgana, a side project of Mortiis
 Fata Morgana, a 1998 compilation album by Morgana Lefay
 Nico's Last Concert: Fata Morgana, a 2000 album by Nico
 Fata Morgana, a 2011 album by AWS

Songs
 "Fata Morgana", a 1984 song by Dissidenten
 "Fata Morgana", a 1985 song by Erste Allgemeine Verunsicherung from Geld oder Leben! 
 "Fata Morgana", a 1986 song by Fates Warning from Awaken the Guardian 
 "Fatamorgana (Mirage)", a 1989 song by Ofra Haza from Desert Wind 
 "Fata Morgana", a 1993 song by Litfiba from Terremoto
 "Fata Morgana", a 1993 song by Dana International from Danna International (Offer Nissim Presents)
 "Fata morgana", a 2003 song by Mariza Koch
 "Fata Morgana", a 2007 song by El Guincho from Alegranza
 "Fata Morgana", a 2017 song by Markul & Oxxxymiron
 Fata Morgana, a side project involving Tim Alexander of Primus

Classical music
 "Fata Morgana Polka-mazurka", a polka by Johann Strauss, 1868
 Fata Morgana, a character in Sergei Prokofiev's 1921 opera The Love for Three Oranges

Places
 Fata Morgana (Efteling), an amusement park ride in North Brabant, Netherlands
 Fata Morgana Land, a phantom island in the Arctic
 Fatamorgana (photo school), in Copenhagen, Denmark

See also
 
 Fata (disambiguation)
 Morgana (disambiguation)
 Fonte della Fata Morgana, a 15th-century building near Florence, Italy
 The House in Fata Morgana, a 2012 video game